The 2015–16 season was Portsmouth's 117th season of existence and their third consecutive season in League Two. Along with competing in League Two, the club participated in the FA Cup, League Cup and Football League Trophy. The season covers the period from 1 July 2015 to 30 June 2016.

Players

Squad details

Transfers

In

 

 

Total spending:  £225,000

Out

Total spending:  £275,000

Contracts

Player statistics

Squad stats

|-
|colspan="16"|Players on loan to other clubs:

|-
|colspan="16"|Players who have left the club after the start of the season:

|-
|}

Top scorers

Disciplinary record

Competitions

Pre-season friendlies
On 6 May 2015, Portsmouth announced two pre-season friendlies, Away to Havant & Waterlooville on 11 July 2015 and Away to Bognor Regis Town on 17 July 2015. On 28 May 2015, the club announced they will also travel to play Gillingham. A day later, Portsmouth announced they will travel to face Woking. On 31 May 2015, Portsmouth added Gosport Borough to their pre-season programme. On 11 July 2015, Portsmouth announced a friendly against Coventry City.

League Two

League table

Matches
On 17 June 2015, the fixtures for the forthcoming season were announced.

FA Cup

League Cup
On 16 June 2015, the first round draw was made, Portsmouth were drawn at home against Derby County. In the second round, Portsmouth were drawn at home again this time against Reading.

Football League Trophy
On 8 August 2015, live on Soccer AM the draw for the first round of the Football League Trophy was drawn by Toni Duggan and Alex Scott. Pompey travelled to Exeter City.

Football League play-offs

References

Portsmouth
Portsmouth F.C. seasons